Founded in 1951, World Physiotherapy is the sole international voice for physiotherapy, representing more than 625,000 physiotherapists worldwide through its 121 member organisations. World Physiotherapy is the operating name of World Confederation for Physical Therapy (WCPT).

World Physiotherapy is committed to furthering the physiotherapy profession and improving global health. It believes every individual is entitled to the highest possible standard of culturally appropriate healthcare, delivered in an atmosphere of trust and respect for human dignity, and underpinned by sound clinical reasoning and scientific evidence.

World Physiotherapy is a non-profit organisation and is registered as a charity in the UK. It has been in official relations with the World Health Organization (WHO) since 1952, collaborating on work programmes to improve world health. It works with a wide range of other international bodies and is a member of the World Health Professions Alliance.

Vision and mission

World Physiotherapy's vision is to move physiotherapy forward so the profession is recognised globally for its significant role in improving health and wellbeing.

As the international voice of physiotherapy World Physiotherapy's mission is to:
 unite the profession internationally
 represent physical therapy and physical therapists internationally
 promote high standards of physical therapy practice, education and research
 facilitate communication and information exchange among member organisations, regions, subgroups and their members
 collaborate with national and international organisations
 contribute to the improvement of global health.

Activity

World Physiotherapy provides services to its member organisations, campaigns to improve world health, and produces policies and guidelines. It encourages high standards of physiotherapy and global health by facilitating the exchange of information and producing resources.

All of its activities are shaped and informed by research. In 2013, a study reported which World Physiotherapy countries/territories allow physiotherapy direct access. A 2020 study reported which World Physiotherapy countries/territories allow physiotherapists to order diagnostic imaging.

World Physiotherapy’s website is the hub of its information sharing activity.

History and growth

Founded in 1951 by 11 national physiotherapy organizations from Australia, Canada, Denmark, Finland, Great Britain, New Zealand, Norway, South Africa, West Germany, Sweden, and the United States of America.

The first international congress and second general meeting were held in London in 1953, where the first executive committee was elected.

World Physiotherapy has developed statements, including Education Guidelines, to support the development of the profession. It has developed a structure of five regions, and close relationships with international independent organisations of physiotherapists with specific interests – 14 of which are now recognised as subgroups of World Physiotherapy.

World Physiotherapy Congress
World Physiotherapy holds a congress every two years, where the world of physiotherapy meets.

The World Physiotherapy Congress is the largest international gathering of physiotherapists, bringing together clinicians, educators, researchers, managers, and policy makers. The next congress will be in April 2021 in Dubai, UAE.

Previous congresses
2019 Geneva, Switzerland - (Congress proceedings)
2017 Cape Town, South Africa
2015 Singapore
2011  Amsterdam, Netherlands
2007  Vancouver, Canada
2003  Barcelona, Spain
1999  Yokohama, Japan
1995  Washington DC, United States
1991  London, UK
1987  Sydney, Australia
1982  Stockholm, Sweden
1978  Tel Aviv, Israel
1974  Montreal, Canada
1970  Amsterdam, Netherlands
1967  Melbourne, Australia
1963  Copenhagen, Denmark
1959  Paris, France
1956  New York City, United States
1953  London, UK

See also
 World Health Organization
 World Health Professions Alliance

References

 World Physiotherapy website

International medical and health organizations